Neil McLachlan King (7 July 1889 – 14 July 1955) was an Australian rules footballer for Essendon in the Victorian Football League (VFL).

Football
He played his final VFL match in 1915 having played three matches.

Footnotes

References
 Maplestone, M., Flying Higher: History of the Essendon Football Club 1872–1996, Essendon Football Club, (Melbourne), 1996. : note that Maplestone (pp.403, 457, and 458) has him as "Norman King".

External links
 
 

1889 births
Essendon Football Club players
Australian rules footballers from Melbourne
1955 deaths
People from Footscray, Victoria